The Middlesex Senior Charity Cup is a knock-out system football competition that has been running since 1901. It was presented in 1901 by C.S. Goldmann, Esq. and was first played for in the 1901–02 season, the first winners being Clapton Orient. The competition is run mainly for non-league clubs in the region, although league sides have been known to enter the competition, such as Barnet, Brentford Chelsea Tottenham Hotspur and Q.P.R. Hayes have won the competition the most times, with 15 wins (their first victory came in 1932 and their most recent in 1991). 

In 1988, the final, sponsored by Russell Grant in which Hendon beat Wembley 2–0, was played at Wembley Stadium.

On 25 April 2007, Harrow Borough retained the Cup for a second year by beating Brook House at Staines Town's Wheatsheaf Park 5–4 on penalties after the match had finished 0–0 after extra time. The 2009–10 season holders were North Greenford United, who beat the previous holders, Enfield Town, 1–0 in the final at Hampton and Richmond Borough's Beveree Stadium. Enfield Town had beaten Hillingdon Borough 4-1 after extra time on 30 April 2008 at Hayes and Yeading's Church Road stadium. In the 2008-09 season, the competition was cancelled after one first round match had been played.

The 2011/12 final was contested between two sides from the Southern Football League, as Northwood played Ashford Town. Northwood overcame rivals Uxbridge 3–2 in the semi-final, whilst Ashford Town comprehensively beat Rayners Lane 4–0 to also progress to the final. The game was played on Bank Holiday Monday, 7 May at Grosvenor Vale in Ruislip, home of Wealdstone.

Ashford won the game 4–2 on penalties after it had finished 4–4 at the end of 90 minutes. Town had battled back from 3–0 down against Northwood to lead 4–3 but Romaine Walker's equaliser took the game to spot kicks.

Uxbridge won back to back editions of the cup. in 2012–13 they defeated a youthful Brentford side 5–2, after trailing 2–0 at half time. They retained the trophy in 2013–14 with a hard fought 3–1 victory over Wembley at Vale Farm.

The 2014–15 final saw Harrow Borough, who had already won the 2014-15 Middlesex Senior Cup, beat Cockfosters 3–0 in the final on Saturday 1 August to complete the 'Middlesex double'.

The 2015–16 final saw Cockfosters, in the final for a second straight season, face Hanworth Villa. However Hanworth Villa would claim a 2–0 win on 2 May 2016 in the final played at Chestnut Avenue, the home of Northwood FC.

Winners
1901–02 Clapton Orient
1902–03 West Hampstead 
1903–04 Ealing 
1904–05 Ealing 
1905–06 West Hampstead  
1906–07 Shepherds Bush 
1907–08 Uxbridge 
1908–09 Hounslow 
1909–10 Enfield 
1910–11 Southall 
1911–12 Southall 
1912–13 Uxbridge 
1913–14 Southall 
1914–19 No Competition 
1919–20 Enfield 
1920–21 Botwell Mission  
1921–22 Hampstead Town 
1922–23 Southall & Botwell Mission (joint holders)  
1923–24 Southall & Botwell Mission (joint holders) 
1924–25 Barnet 
1925–26 Botwell Mission  
1926–27 Barnet & Hampstead Town (joint holders)  
1927–28 Southall 
1928–29 Botwell Mission  
1929–30 Wealdstone 
1930–31 Wealdstone 
1931–32 Enfield 
1932–33 Hayes 
1933–34 Hayes 
1934–35 Uxbridge Town  
1935–36 Golders Green 
1936–37 Southall 
1937–38 Wealdstone 
1938–39 Wealdstone 
1939–40 Wealdstone 
1940–41* Wealdstone 
1941–42* Wealdstone 
1942–43* Finchley 
1943–44* Tufnell Park 
1944–45* Golders Green 
1945–46 Golders Green 
1946–47 Hendon 
1947–48 Hendon 
1948–49 Hayes 
1949–50 Wealdstone 
1950–51 Finchley 
1951–52 Southall 
1952–53 Hounslow Town 
1953–54 Hendon 
1954–55 Hayes 
1955–56 Hounslow Town  
1956–57 Hendon 
1957–58 Finchley 
1958–59 Enfield 
1959–60 Hounslow Town 
1960–61 Enfield 
1961–62 Enfield & Hounslow Town (joint holders)  
1962–63 Hayes 
1963–64 Wealdstone 
1964–65 Finchley 
1965–66 Hounslow Town 
1966–67 No Competition 
1967–68 Wealdstone & Wembley (joint holders)  
1968–69 Southall 
1969–70 Hampton 
1970–71 Hayes 
1971–72 Hayes 
1972–73 Hayes 
1973–74 Finchley 
1974–75 Hayes 
1975–76 Hendon 
1976–77 Hendon 
1977–78 Hillingdon Borough  
1978–79 Hendon 
1979–80 Harrow Borough 
1980–81 Wembley & Wealdstone (joint winners)  
1981–82 Uxbridge 
1982–83 Wembley 
1983–84 Southall 
1984–85 Hendon 
1985–86 Kingsbury Town  
1986–87 Wembley 
1987–88 Hendon 
1988–89 Chelsea 
1989–90 Chelsea 
1990–91 Hayes 
1991–92 Chelsea 
1992–93 Harrow Borough  
1993–94 Staines Town 
1994–95 Wembley 
1995–96 Hampton 
1996–97 Edgware Town 
1997–98 Hampton 
1998–99 Hampton 
1999–00 Ashford Town (Middlesex)  
2000–01 No Competition 
2001–02 Enfield Town 
2002–03 Feltham 
2003–04 Wealdstone 
2004–05 Yeading 
2005–06 Harrow Borough  
2006–07 Harrow Borough 
2007–08 Enfield Town 
2008–09 No Competition 
2009–10 North Greenford United 
2010–11 Wealdstone 
2011–12 Ashford Town (Middlesex) 
2012–13 Uxbridge 
2013–14 Uxbridge 
2014–15 Harrow Borough 
2015–16 Hanworth Villa 
2016–17 Ashford Town (Middlesex) 
2017–18 Hanworth Villa 
2018–19 Uxbridge  
2019–20 Competition abandoned due to the Covid pandemic 
2020–21 No Competition 
2021–22 Uxbridge  

Source

See also

Middlesex County Football Association
Middlesex Senior Cup
George Ruffell Memorial Shield

References

County Cup competitions
Recurring sporting events established in 1901
1901 establishments in England
Sport in Middlesex